Tim Harris  is an English football manager currently in charge of Worcester City.

Harris was a professional football player for several clubs, including Shrewsbury Town, Newport County, Cheltenham Town, Redditch United and as a goalkeeper for Gloucester City in the late 1970s. He was an assistant manager at Gloucester City twice, and has previous experience as a manager with Forest Green Rovers, Cinderford Town, Newport County and Merthyr Tydfil.

In 2006 Harris was appointed as First Team Manager at Gloucester City, saving them from relegation and finishing in a respectable 13th place. In 2008 Harris moved 'upstairs' and became General Manager, handing over the first team manager job to assistant David Mehew.  Gloucester gained promotion to the Football Conference for the 2009–10 season, via a play-off win at Farnborough.

The following week Harris was appointed as General Manager at Newport County alongside team manager Dean Holdsworth. Newport County were champions of the Conference South for the 2009–10 season and promoted to the Conference National for the 2010–11 season. Following Dean Holdsworth's departure, Harris was appointed caretaker manager on 13 January 2011. Following the appointment of Anthony Hudson on 1 April, Harris returned to his role as Director of Football. During his reign as director County won promotion to the Football League and also moved from Newport Stadium to share with local rugby sides Newport RFC and Newport Gwent Dragons at the 8,000 capacity (for football) Rodney Parade

In February 2014, he was re-appointed as first team manager at Gloucester City, replacing David Mehew. Harris once again steered the club away from relegation. Harris resigned as team manager on 30 November 2017.

In December 2017, he was appointed manager of Southern Premier Division side Redditch United.

On 19 September 2018, Harris was appointed Head of Football at National League North side Hereford. with Marc Richards subsequently taking the Head Coach role at Hereford on 3 October 2018. On 13 August 2019, Harris was appointed caretaker manager until Russell Slade was hired on 29 August 2019. Harris decided to resign on 27 November 2019.

On 4 January 2021, Harris was appointed manager of Worcester City in the Midland Football League.

Managerial statistics

References

Head of Football says Bulls need to be full-time 'sooner rather than later'

1959 births
Living people
English football managers
Cheltenham Town F.C. players
Gloucester City A.F.C. players
Gloucester City A.F.C. managers
Newport County A.F.C. players
Newport County A.F.C. managers
Forest Green Rovers F.C. managers
Cinderford Town A.F.C. managers
Tamworth F.C. managers
Worcester City F.C. managers
People from Dymock
Association football goalkeepers
English footballers
Hereford F.C. managers